Copenhagen is a 2002 British television drama film written and directed by Howard Davies, and starring Daniel Craig, Stephen Rea, and  Francesca Annis. It is based on Michael Frayn's 1998 Tony Award-winning three-character play of the same name.

Synopsis
The story concerns a meeting between the physicists Niels Bohr and Werner Heisenberg in Copenhagen in 1941 to discuss their work and past friendship, and also revolves around Heisenberg's role in the German atomic bomb program during World War II.

Cast
 Stephen Rea as Niels Bohr
 Daniel Craig as Werner Heisenberg
 Francesca Annis as Margrethe Bohr

Production
The film was produced by BBC Fictionlab for BBC Four, in association with KCET.

Release
The film was first broadcast on BBC Four on 26 September 2002, preceded by a prologue with Frayn, and followed by an epilogue by physicist Michio Kaku and a documentary on the historical events. It was broadcast in the United States on PBS (the Public Broadcasting Service) as part of the series Hollywood Presents.

References

External links
 
 
 

British television films
Films about nuclear war and weapons
Films about Nobel laureates
Biographical films about scientists
British films based on plays
2002 films
Niels Bohr
Werner Heisenberg